HMCS New Liskeard was a reciprocating engine-powered  built for the Royal Canadian Navy during the Second World War. Following the war, the ship saw service first as a training ship and then later, as an oceanographic research vessel. She remained in service until 1969.

Design and description
The ships' complement consisted of 85 officers and ratings.

The reciprocating ships had two vertical triple-expansion steam engines, each driving one shaft, using steam provided by two Admiralty three-drum boilers.

The Algerine class was armed with a QF  Mk V anti-aircraft gun and four twin-gun mounts for Oerlikon 20 mm cannon. The latter guns were in short supply when the first ships were being completed and they often got a proportion of single mounts. By 1944, single-barrel Bofors 40 mm mounts began replacing the twin 20 mm mounts on a one for one basis. All of the ships were fitted for four throwers and two rails for depth charges. Many Canadian ships omitted their sweeping gear in exchange for a 24-barrel Hedgehog spigot mortar and a stowage capacity for 90+ depth charges.

Construction and career
New Liskeard, named for New Liskeard, Ontario, was laid down on 8 July 1943 by Port Arthur Shipbuilding Co. Ltd. at Port Arthur, Ontario. The ship was launched on 14 January 1944 and was commissioned into the Royal Canadian Navy on 21 November 1944 at Port Arthur.

Following her commissioning, New Liskeard sailed down the St. Lawrence River to Halifax, Nova Scotia. The minesweeper was then dispatched to Bermuda for workups before returning to Halifax. Once there the vessel joined the Western Escort Force in April 1945 for convoy escort duties in the Battle of the Atlantic. She was assigned to escort group W-8 and remained with them until the group's disbandment in June 1945.

This position lasted until September when the minesweeper was placed in reserve at Sydney, Nova Scotia. The ship was then taken to Halifax, where she remained in reserve until the end of 1945. After refitting at Halifax, the ship was recommissioned on 9 April 1946 as a training vessel. In 1948, the minesweeper was used for oceanographic duties. New Liskeard was paid off on 22 April 1958.

New Liskeard was fully converted into an oceanographic research vessel. The ship was outfitted with two oceanographic and acoustic laboratories. The ship performed this role until 1 May 1969. That same year, she was taken to Dartmouth Cove, Nova Scotia and broken up.

See also
 List of ships of the Canadian Navy

References

Bibliography

External links 
 Haze Gray and Underway
 ReadyAyeReady.com

Algerine-class minesweepers of the Royal Canadian Navy
Ships built in Ontario
1944 ships
World War II minesweepers of Canada
World War II escort ships of Canada